Lamprostola is a genus of moths in the subfamily Arctiinae described by Schaus in 1899.

Species
 Lamprostola aglaope Felder, 1875
 Lamprostola endochrysis Dognin, 1909
 Lamprostola nitens Hampson, 1900
 Lamprostola olivacea Schaus, 1896
 Lamprostola molybdipera Schaus, 1899
 Lamprostola pascuala Schaus, 1896
 Lamprostola thermeola Dognin, 1912
 Lamprostola unifasciella Strand, 1922

References

External links

Lithosiini
Moth genera